Evgeni Yordanov may refer to:

 Evgeni Yordanov (footballer) (born 1978), Bulgarian footballer
 Evgeni Yordanov (high jumper) (born 1940), Bulgarian track and field athlete